Skálholt is a historical site in the south of Iceland, at the river Hvítá.

History
Skálholt was, through eight centuries, one of the most important places in Iceland. A bishopric was established in Skálholt in 1056. Until 1785, it was one of Iceland's two episcopal sees, along with Hólar, making it a cultural and political center. Iceland's first official school, Skálholtsskóli  (now Reykjavík Gymnasium, MR), was founded at Skálholt in 1056 to educate clergy. In 1992 the seminary in Skálholt was re-instituted under the old name and now serves as the education and information center of the Church of Iceland.

Throughout the Middle Ages there was significant activity in Skálholt; alongside the bishop's office, the cathedral, and the school, there was extensive farming, a smithy, and, while Catholicism lasted, a monastery. Along with dormitories and quarters for teachers and servants, the town made up a sizable gathering of structures. Adam of Bremen, writing circa 1075, described Skálholt (Scaldholz) as the "largest city" in Iceland. First the diocese of Skálholt was a suffragan of the Archdiocese of Hamburg-Bremen. When in 1104 the Diocese of Lund was elevated to an archdiocese, Lund became the metropolitan of Skálholt, and in 1153 Skálholt became a part of the province of Nidaros.

Continuing as the episcopal see after the Reformation to Lutheranism, the end of Catholicism in Iceland was marked in 1550 when the last Catholic bishop, Jón Arason of Hólar, was executed in Skálholt along with his two sons.  The sacred reliquary of St. Thorlac (sixth bishop of Skálholt) was maintained at the cathedral until it too was destroyed in 1550, when his mortal remains were strewn about the cathedral grounds. 

Although no longer episcopal sees, Skálholt and Hólar are still the cathedra of the Church of Iceland's two suffragan bishops, and therefore the old cathedrals still serve as such.

Skálholt also receives many visitors each year. Hospitality is a branch of Skálholtsskóli's work and visitors can stay in its dormitories, single rooms, and cottages. Many cultural events such as concerts are held in Skálholt. Foremost of these is the Summer Concerts program in July, in which prominent classical musicians, choirs and other musicians are invited to perform.

Cathedral

The current cathedral at Skálholt is relatively large in comparison to most Icelandic churches; its span from door to apse is approximately 30 meters. Some of its predecessors were even longer, reaching up to 50 m in length. The new cathedral was built from 1956 to 1963 as a part of the millennial celebrations of the episcopal see. The other Scandinavian churches celebrated this along with the Icelandic church and many of the new cathedral's items are gifts of theirs; for example, Gerður Helgadóttir's extensive stained glass windows are a gift from the Danes.

Map

In the late 16th century Sigurður Stefánsson, a young teacher from Skálholt and grandson of a Skálholt bishop, used the available documentary evidence to mark the sites of the ancient Norse discoveries in the western Atlantic, including Vinland, on a map. After studying at the University of Copenhagen, Sigurður became a teacher at the former monastery of Skálholt, which remained the religious and educational centre in Iceland even after Protestantism was introduced in 1551.

The 1570 original of Sigurður's Map no longer survives, but a copy was made in 1690 by Þórður Þorláksson (also known by his Latinized name, Thorlacius), the Bishop of Skálholt, and is now in the collection of the Danish Royal Library. Numerous other copies were made by Scandinavian scholars. By matching latitudes with the British Isles, the map shows the northern tip of "Vinland" as being at about 51 degrees north, the same latitude as the southern tip of Ireland and Bristol, England.

See also
List of Skálholt bishops
List of settlements in Iceland
History of Iceland

References

Other sources
 Adam of Bremen (edited by G. Waitz) (1876). Gesta Hammaburgensis ecclesiae pontificum. Berlin. Available online
 Adam of Bremen (translated by Francis Joseph Tschan and Timothy Reuter) (2002). History of the Archbishops of Hamburg-Bremen. Columbia University Press.

External links

 Skálholt.is
 Info on Skálholt from Southern Iceland's tourist bureau
 Skálholt Map - in The Royal Library, Copenhagen, Denmark

Populated places in Iceland
History of Christianity in Iceland
Viking Age populated places
Norse colonization of North America